Gmelina arborea, (in English beechwood, gmelina, goomar teak, Kashmir tree, Malay beechwood, white teak, yamane ), locally known as gamhar, is a fast-growing deciduous tree in the family Lamiaceae.

Distribution and habitat

Gmelina arborea grows naturally throughout India, Myanmar, Thailand, Laos, Cambodia, Vietnam and in southern provinces of China. Since the 1960s, it has been introduced extensively as fast-growing timber trees in Brazil, Gambia, Honduras, Ivory Coast, Malaysia, Malawi, Nigeria, the Philippines, and Sierra Leone. It is also planted in gardens and avenues.

Utilization of the species

The Lion Throne, the most important, and last surviving, of the eight royal thrones of Myanmar, now in the National Museum in Yangon, is carved from Gmelina arborea wood.

Chemistry 
Lignans, such as 6" - bromo - isoarboreol, 4-hydroxysesamin, 4,8-dihydroxysesamin, 1,4-dihydroxysesamin (gummadiol), 2-piperonyl-3-hydroxymethyl-4-(α-hydroxy-3,4-methylenedioxybenzyl)-4-hydroxytetrahydrofuran and the 4-O-glucoside of 4-epigummadiol, can be isolated from the heartwood of Gmelina arborea. The parent compounds are arboreol or gmelanone.

Umbelliferone 7-apiosylglucoside can be isolated from the root.

Five constituents, isolated from the heartwood of G. arborea, (+)-7′-O-ethyl arboreol, (+)-paulownin, (+)-gmelinol, (+)-epieudesmin and (−)-β-sitosterol, show antifungal activity against Trametes versicolor.

References 

GAMHAR (Gmelina arborea): Indian Council of Forestry Research and Education, Dehradun
Crop index at the Purdue University

External links

arborea
Flora of China
Flora of tropical Asia
Plants used in Ayurveda
Symbols of Meghalaya